Endless Love is a 2014 Burmese thriller-drama film, directed by Thein Han (Phoenix) starring Nay Toe, Wai Lu Kyaw and Wutt Hmone Shwe Yi.

Cast
Nay Toe as Thurikza, Thura Satka (dual role)
Wai Lu Kyaw as Min Thiha, Thake Di (dual role)
Sai Thiha as Nanda
Wutt Hmone Shwe Yi as Twe Tar Oo, Yu Par (dual role)
Kyu Kyu Thin as Aunty Kyu
K Nyi as Phoe Lone
A Ni Zaw as Nan Phyu

References

2014 films
2010s Burmese-language films
Burmese thriller films
Films shot in Myanmar